Evrim Alataş (born 15 April 1976; Gölpınar, Akçadağ – 12 April 2010; Diyarbakır) was a Kurdish writer, journalist, screenwriter and human rights activist. Alataş is described as the first female Kurdish writer of Turkey. Her works include the film Min Dît: The Children of Diyarbakır from 2009, which won the grand jury prize at the 46th Antalya Golden Orange Film Festival.

Born in the village of Gölpınar in Malatya in 1976 to a Kurdish family, Alataş started her journalism career in 1994 by working as a reporter and editor at various left-wing newspapers such as Yeni Politika, Özgür Bakış, Ülkede Özgür Gündem and later as a columnist for Evrensel and BirGün. Many of her writings for these newspapers were about Kurds in Turkey.

Alataş died in 2010 from cancer in her home in Diyarbakır and was buried in her home village of Gölpınar.

Literature

See also
Human rights in Turkey

References

1976 births
2010 deaths
Kurdish journalists
People from Akçadağ
Deaths from cancer in Turkey